Warren "Chaka Zulu" Stevelmans (born 16 May 1983) is a South African kickboxer, fighting out of Vos Gym in Amsterdam, Netherlands. He is the K-1 MAX Netherlands 2008 tournament champion.

Biography and career
Despite being born in South Africa, Stevelmans has spent the bulk of his career fighting in the Netherlands.  He began his career at C-Class level in 2001 and through 2001 to 2005 won a number of C and B-Class fights, culminating in winning his A-Class debut against Arian Vatniki in Maastricht, Netherlands.  Stevelmans lost his next fight against Chris Ngimbi but then went on a winning streak throughout the rest of 2006 and in to the later stages of 2007 where he won his first title, defeating William Diender to claim the N.K.B.B. national title at 70 kg.

Stevelmans performances at domestic level gave him the chance to take his talents on to the world stage as he was invited by K-1 to participate in one of their regional qualifying tournaments at the K-1 MAX Netherlands 2008 held in Utrecht.  Stevelmans was the victor at a very competitive tournament, defeating two time SuperLeague champion Alviar Lima in the quarter finals, gaining revenge on Chris Ngimbi in the semis via TKO and beating Marco Piqué in the final to book his place at the K-1 Final 16 event.  Stevelmans won his elimination fight in Hiroshima, Japan and advanced to the quarter final stage at the K-1 World MAX Final 8.  Unfortunately for Stevelmans he was paired up against two time K-1 MAX world champion Andy Souwer who proved too strong for him over three rounds.

After his exit from the 2008 K-1 World MAX Stevelmans has been inconsistent.  He picked up a good victory against Alviar Lima but has struggled against world class opposition, losing fights to the likes of Giorgio Petrosyan, Albert Kraus and Mike Zambidis.  At the start of 2011, Stevelmans returned to K-1 MAX entering the K-1 MAX Madrid 2011 tournament.  He beat two Spanish opponents en route to the final but was unable to win the title, losing to his third Spanish opponent on the night in Rafi Zouheir, via decision over three rounds.

He defeated Hinata Watanabe via unanimous decision (30-28, 28–27 and 29–28) at Shootboxing 2012 – Act 4 on 17 September 2012 in Tokyo, Japan to qualify for the 2012 S-Cup.

He was expected to compete in the 2012 Thai Fight 70 kg tournament, fighting in the quarter-finals on 23 October 2012 in Bangkok. However, this did not happen for unknown reasons.

Replacing Yoshihiro Sato on short notice, he defeated Dzhabar Askerov via unanimous decision in a tournament reserve fight at Glory 3: Rome - 2012 Middleweight Slam Final 8 in Rome, Italy on 3 November 2012.

He was expected to compete at the Shoot Boxing World Tournament 2012 in Tokyo, Japan on 17 November 2012. However, he was unable to compete due to the tournament coming so soon after his bout with Askerov.

He beat Thai brawler Bovy Sor Udomson by way of majority decision at Shootboxing 2013 – Act 1 in Tokyo on 22 February 2013.

Stevelmans was scheduled to fight Johann Fauveau at Glory 5: London on 23 March 2013 in London, England. However, when Andy Ristie was unable to fight in the event's co-main event against Albert Kraus, Stevelmans took his place and lost by unanimous decision.

He was soundly beaten by Aikpracha Meenayothin, losing on points at MAX Muay Thai 2 in Pattaya, Thailand on 29 June 2013.

He lost to Chingiz Allazov by unanimous decision at Legend 2: Invasion in Moscow, Russia on 8 November 2013.

Replacing Shemsi Beqiri on short notice, Stevelmans lost to Ky Hollenbeck by unanimous decision in an ugly fight in the tournament reserve match at Glory 12: New York - Lightweight World Championship Tournament in New York City, New York on 23 November 2013.

He lost to Yuri Bessmertny by UD at Thai Boxe Mania in Turin, Italy on 25 January 2014.

He lost to Josh Jauncey via UD at Glory 16: Denver in Broomfield, Colorado, US on 3 April 2014.

Titles
 2011 K-1 MAX Madrid 2011 runner up −70 kg
 2010 World Full Contact Association (W.F.C.A.) Thai-boxing middleweight world title −72.5 kg 
 2008 K-1 MAX Netherlands champion −70 kg
 2006 N.K.B.B. Dutch national champion

Kickboxing record 

|-
|-  style="background:#fbb;"
| 2017-06-24 || Loss ||align=left| Masoud Minaei || Kunlun Fight 63  || Sanya, China || Decision (Unanimous) || 3 || 3:00
|-
! style=background:white colspan=9 |
|- style="background:#fbb;"
| 2017-04-23 || Loss ||align=left| Redouan Daoudi  || WFL – Champion vs. Champion|| Almere, Netherlands || Decision || 3 || 3:00
|-
|- style="background:#fbb;"
| 2016-10-21 || Loss ||align=left| Stanislav Kazantsev || W5 CHOOSE THE WAY OF A CHAMPION || Moscow, Russia || Decision (Unanimous) || 3 || 3:00
|-
|-
|- style="background:#fbb;" 
| 2016-10-08 || Loss ||align=left| Nayanesh Ayman  || Enfusion Live 42 || Madrid, Spain || Decision (Unanimous) || 3 || 3:00
|-
|- style="background:#fbb;"
| 2016-06-25 || Loss ||align=left| Florian Marku || Iron Challenge|| Athens, Greece || KO || 1 || 0:30
|-
|- style="background:#fbb;"
| 2016-06-05 || Loss ||align=left| Jomthong Chuwattana || Kunlun Fight 45 || Chengdu, China || Decision (Unanimous) || 3 || 3:00
|-
! style=background:white colspan=9 |
|-
|- style="background:#fbb;"
| 2016-04-16 || Loss ||align=left| Jonay Risco || CAMPEONATO DE CANARIAS AMATEUR 2016|| Spain || Decision (Unanimous) || 3 || 3:00
|-
|-  style="background:#c5d2ea;" 
| 2016-03-25 || Draw ||align=left| Dzhabar Askerov || Kunlun Fight 40 || Tongling, China || Extension round decision || 4 || 3:00 
|- style="background:#fbb;"
| 2015-12-05 || Loss ||align=left| Martin Gaňo || GIBU Fight Night 2 || Prague, Czech Republic || Decision || 3 || 3:00
|-
|- style="background:#fbb;"
| 2015-10-24 || Loss ||align=left| Dong Wenfei || WLF 2015  || Hong Kong, China || Decision (unanimous) || 3 || 3:00
|- style="background:#fbb;"
| 2015-10-16 || Loss ||align=left| Hysni Beqiri || ACB KB 3: Grand Prix Final || Sibiu, Romania || KO (left hook) || 1 || 2:35
|-  style="background:#cfc;"
| 2015-08-22 || Win ||align=left|  Zhao Chunyang  || WLF 2015  || Xiamen, China || Decision (unanimous) || 3 || 3:00
|- style="background:#fbb;"
| 2014-10-11 || Loss ||align=left| Enriko Gogokhia || W5 Grand Prix – Rematch || Moscow, Russia || Decision (unanimous) || 3 || 3:00
|- style="background:#fbb;"
| 2014-05-03 || Loss ||align=left| Josh Jauncey || Glory 16: Denver || Broomfield, Colorado, US || Extension round decision (unanimous) || 4 || 3:00
|- style="background:#fbb;"
| 2014-01-25 || Loss ||align=left| Yuri Bessmertny || Thai Boxe Mania || Turin, Italy || Decision (unanimous) || 3 || 3:00
|-  style="background:#fbb;"
| 2013-11-23 || Loss ||align=left| Ky Hollenbeck || Glory 12: New York || New York City, New York, US || Decision (unanimous) || 3 || 3:00 
|-
! style=background:white colspan=9 |
|-  style="background:#fbb;"
| 2013-11-08 || Loss ||align=left| Chingiz Allazov || Legend 2: Invasion || Moscow, Russia || Decision (unanimous) || 3 || 3:00  
|-  style="background:#fbb;"
| 2013-06-29 || Loss ||align=left| Aikpracha Meenayothin || MAX Muay Thai 2 || Pattaya, Thailand || Decision || 3 || 3:00
|-  style="background:#fbb;"
| 2013-03-23 || Loss ||align=left| Albert Kraus || Glory 5: London || London, England || Decision (unanimous) || 3 || 3:00
|-  style="background:#cfc;"
| 2013-02-22 || Win ||align=left| Bovy Sor Udomson || Shootboxing 2013 – Act 1 || Tokyo, Japan || Decision (majority) || 3 || 3:00
|-  style="background:#cfc;"
| 2012-11-03 || Win ||align=left| Dzhabar Askerov || Glory 3: Rome – 70 kg Slam Tournament, Reserve Bout || Rome, Italy || Decision (unanimous) || 3 || 3:00
|-  style="background:#cfc;"
| 2012-09-17 || Win ||align=left| Hinata Watanabe || Shootboxing 2012 – Act 4 || Tokyo, Japan || Decision (Unanimous) || 3 || 3:00
|-  style="background:#fbb;"
| 2012-09-01 || Loss ||align=left| Denis Schneidmiller || Mix Fight Gala 13|| Frankfurt, Germany || Decision || 3 || 3:00
|-  style="background:#fbb;"
| 2012-05-26 || Loss ||align=left| Sanny Dahlbeck || Glory 1: Stockholm – 70 kg Slam Tournament, First Round || Stockholm, Sweden || Decision || 3 || 3:00
|-  style="background:#fbb;"
| 2012-05-04 || Loss ||align=left| Batu Khasikov || Battle in Kalmykia || Elista, Russia || Decision (Split) || 3 || 3:00
|-  style="background:#cfc;"
| 2012-02-06 || Win ||align=left| Hiroki Shishido || Shootboxing 2012 – Act 1 || Tokyo, Japan || Decision (Unanimous) || 5 || 3:00
|-  style="background:#cfc;"
| 2011-12-09 || Win ||align=left| Wang Anying || GP di Roma 2011|| Rome, Italy || KO || 1 || 
|-  style="background:#fbb;"
| 2011-09-02 || Loss ||align=left| Buakaw Por. Pramuk || Muaythai Premier League: Round 1 || Los Angeles, California, US || TKO (Referee stoppage) || 4 || 
|-
! style=background:white colspan=9 |
|-  style="background:#cfc;"
| 2011-08-05 || Win ||align=left| Alex Oller || Night of the Gladiators || Paramaribo, Suriname || TKO(opgave) || 2 || 3:00
|-  style="background:#cfc;"
| 2011-07-16 || Win ||align=left| Zeben Diaz || Real Fighters gala || Málaga, Spain || KO  || 3 || 
|-  style="background:#c5d2ea;"
| 2011-06-11 || Draw ||align=left| Armen Petrosyan || Kickboxing International  || Rome, Italy || Decision Draw || 3 || 3:00
|-  style="background:#cfc;"
| 2011-03-06 || Win ||align=left| Mohammed Medhar || It's Showtime Sporthallen Zuid || Amsterdam, Netherlands || TKO (Corner Stop) || 3 || 
|-  style="background:#fbb;"
| 2011-01-08 || Loss ||align=left| Rafi Zouheir || K-1 MAX Madrid 2011, Final || Madrid, Spain || Decision || 3 || 3:00
|-
! style=background:white colspan=9 |
|-  style="background:#cfc;"
| 2011-01-08 || Win ||align=left| Rafa del Toro || K-1 MAX Madrid 2011, Semi Finals || Madrid, Spain || Decision || 3 || 3:00
|-  style="background:#cfc;"
| 2011-01-08 || Win ||align=left| Jonay Risco || K-1 MAX Madrid 2011, Quarter Finals || Madrid, Spain || Decision || 3 || 3:00
|-  style="background:#cfc;"
| 2010-12-18 || Win ||align=left| Kenneth van Eesvelde || Fightclub presents: It's Showtime 2010 || Amsterdam, Netherlands || Decision || 3 || 3:00
|-  style="background:#fbb;"
| 2010-04-10 || Loss ||align=left| Chahid Oulad El Hadj || Star Muaythai V || Maastricht, Netherlands || KO || 2 || 
|-  style="background:#fbb;"
| 2010-03-20 || Loss ||align=left| Mike Zambidis || Kickboxing Superstar XIX || Milan, Italy || Decision (Unanimous) || 3 || 3:00
|-  style="background:#cfc;"
| 2010-03-07 || Win ||align=left| Alviar Lima || Time For Action presents: Team SuperPro 10 Year Anniversary || Nijmegen, Netherlands || Decision (Unanimous) || 3 || 3:00
|-
! style=background:white colspan=9 |
|-  style="background:#fbb;"
| 2009-11-29 || Loss ||align=left| Saiyok Pumpanmuang || SLAMM "Nederland vs Thailand VI" || Almere, Netherlands || Decision (Unanimous) || 5 || 3:00
|-  style="background:#cfc;"
| 2009-11-07 || Win ||align=left| Mohammed Gur || Janus FightNight: Thai Boxe Last Challenge || Padua, Italy || TKO || 2 || 
|-  style="background:#cfc;"
| 2009-05-30 || Win ||align=left| Samranchai 96Penang || Star Muaythai IV || Maastricht, Netherlands || Decision (Unanimous) || 5 || 3:00 
|-  style="background:#fbb;"
| 2009-03-28 || Loss ||align=left| Orono Wor Petchpun || Battle of Sweden || Stockholm, Sweden || Decision (Unanimous) || 5 || 3:00
|-  style="background:#fbb;"
| 2009-01-24 || Loss ||align=left| Albert Kraus || Beast of the East 2009 || Zutphen, Netherlands || Decision || 3 || 3:00
|-  style="background:#fbb;"
| 2008-11-29 || Loss ||align=left| Giorgio Petrosyan || It's Showtime 2008 Eindhoven || Eindhoven, Netherlands || Decision (Unanimous) || 3 || 3:00
|-  style="background:#cfc;"
| 2008-09-06 || Win ||align=left| Shane Campbell || It's Showtime 2008 Alkmaar || Alkmaar, Netherlands || Decision || 3 || 3:00 
|-  style="background:#fbb;"
| 2008-07-07 || Loss ||align=left| Andy Souwer || K-1 World MAX 2008 Final 8, Quarter Finals || Tokyo, Japan || Decision (Unanimous) || 3 || 3:00
|-
! style=background:white colspan=9 |
|-  style="background:#fbb;"
| 2008-04-26 || Loss ||align=left| Gago Drago || K-1 World Grand Prix 2008 in Amsterdam, Super Fight || Amsterdam, Netherlands || Decision (Majority) || 3 || 3:00
|-  style="background:#cfc;"
| 2008-04-09 || Win ||align=left| Rosario Presti || K-1 World MAX 2008 Final 16 || Hiroshima, Japan || KO (Left Knee Strike) || 2 || 1:06
|-
! style=background:white colspan=9 |
|-  style="background:#cfc;"
| 2008-02-17 || Win ||align=left| Marco Piqué || K-1 MAX Netherlands 2008, Final || Utrecht, Netherlands || Decision (Unanimous) || 3 || 3:00
|-
! style=background:white colspan=9 |
|-  style="background:#cfc;"
| 2008-02-17 || Win ||align=left| Chris Ngimbi || K-1 MAX Netherlands 2008, Semi Finals || Utrecht, Netherlands || TKO (Low Kicks) || 2 || 1:48
|-  style="background:#cfc;"
| 2008-02-17 || Win ||align=left| Alviar Lima || K-1 MAX Netherlands 2008, Quarter Finals || Utrecht, Netherlands || Decision (Split) || 3 || 3:00
|-  style="background:#c5d2ea;"
| 2008-01-26 || Draw ||align=left| Chahid Oulad El Hadj || Beast of the East 2008 || Zutphen, Netherlands || Decision Draw || 3 || 3:00
|-  style="background:#cfc;"
| 2007-11-24 || Win ||align=left| Benito Caupain || Rings Gala || Hilversum, Netherlands || Decision || 5 || 3:00
|-  style="background:#fbb;"
| 2007-10-27 || Loss ||align=left| Kenneth van Eesvelde || One Night in Bangkok || Antwerp, Belgium || Decision || 5 || 3:00
|-  style="background:#cfc;"
| 2007-09-23 || Win ||align=left| William Diender || Rings Holland: Risky Business || Utrecht, Netherlands || TKO (Doctor Stoppage) || 2 || 
|-
! style=background:white colspan=9 |
|-  style="background:#cfc;"
| 2007-06-08 || Win ||align=left| Vitor Seromenho || Gala dos Campeos || Lisbon, Portugal || TKO || 1 ||
|-  style="background:#cfc;"
| 2007-05-06 || Win ||align=left| Jan van Denderen || SLAMM "Nederland vs Thailand III" || Haarlem, Netherlands || Decision || 5 || 3:00
|-  style="background:#cfc;"
| 2007-03-25 || Win ||align=left| Yassine Lahmidi || Rings – "The Chosen Ones" || Utrecht, Netherlands || Decision || 5 || 3:00
|-  style="background:#cfc;"
| 2007-02-27 || Win ||align=left| Dave van de Bloeg || Beast of the East 2007 || Zutphen, Netherlands || TKO || 1 || 3:00
|-  style="background:#cfc;"
| 2006-12-03 || Win ||align=left| Marijn Geuens || 2H2H Gala || Maastricht, Netherlands || KO (Punches) || 1 || 1:19
|-  style="background:#cfc;"
| 2006-10-07 || Win ||align=left| Mark Ollie || Muaythai All Style Gala Martial Arts part II || Leek, Netherlands || Decision (Unanimous) || 5 || 3:00
|-  style="background:#cfc;"
| 2006-09-17 || Win ||align=left| Mesut Derin || Muay Thai Gala || Nijmegen, Netherlands || TKO || ||
|-  style="background:#fbb;"
| 2006-04-15 || Loss ||align=left| Chris Ngimbi || Al-Fid Thaibox Gala|| Eindhoven, Netherlands || Decision || 3 || 3:00
|-  style="background:#cfc;"
| 2005-12-17 || Win ||align=left| Arian Vatniki || 2H2H || Maastricht, Netherlands || Decision || 5 || 3:00
|-  style="background:#cfc;"
| 2005-06-11 || Win ||align=left| Rastagar Berrouz || Gala Dokkum "Warriors of the North" || Dokkum, Netherlands || Decision || 5 || 2:00
|-  style="background:#cfc;"
| 2005-03-13 || Win ||align=left| Rafik Tahiri || Muay Thai Gala Odeon || Rotterdam, Netherlands || Decision || 5 || 2:00
|-  style="background:#cfc;"
| 2004-11-13 || Win ||align=left| Ton Sansuek || Gala Sportlife || Heerlen, Netherlands || KO || ||
|-  style="background:#fbb;"
| 2003-02-15 || Loss ||align=left| Karim El Assati || Thaibox Gala Geeraets|| Sevenum, Netherlands || Decision || 5 || 2:00
|-  style="background:#cfc;"
| 2003-01-25 || Win ||align=left| Micha Niedekker || Champions Gym Muay Thai Gala || Sittard, Netherlands || TKO (Corner Stoppage) || 4 ||
|-  style="background:#cfc;"
| 2002-11-10 || Win ||align=left| Micha Niedekker || Champions Gym Gala in Hanenhof || Geleen, Netherlands || Decision || 3 || 2:00
|-  style="background:#cfc;"
| 2002-06-02 || Win ||align=left| Edie Benton || Duran Ebren Promotion || Eindhoven, Netherlands || Decision (Unanimous) || 3 || 2:00
|-  style="background:#fbb;"
| 2002-03-16 || Loss ||align=left| Mohamed Loukili || Theo van den Oever Promotion || Sint-Oedenrode, Netherlands || Decision || 3 || 2:00
|-  style="background:#cfc;"
| 2001-09-22 || Win ||align=left| Mohamed El Hadouchi || Champions Gym Gala in Hanenhof || Geleen, Netherlands || Decision || 3 || 2:00
|-
| colspan=9 | Legend:

See also
List of male kickboxers
List of K-1 Events

References

1983 births
Living people
South African male kickboxers
Welterweight kickboxers
South African Muay Thai practitioners
South African expatriates in the Netherlands
Glory kickboxers
Kunlun Fight kickboxers